In mathematics, an integral curve is a parametric curve that represents a specific solution to an ordinary differential equation or system of equations.

Name
Integral curves are known by various other names, depending on the nature and interpretation of the differential equation or vector field. In physics, integral curves for an electric field or magnetic field are known as field lines, and integral curves for the velocity field of a fluid are known as streamlines. In dynamical systems, the integral curves for a differential equation that governs a system are referred to as trajectories or orbits.

Definition
Suppose that F is a static vector field, that is, a vector-valued function with Cartesian coordinates (F1,F2,...,Fn), and that x(t) is a parametric curve with Cartesian coordinates (x1(t),x2(t),...,xn(t)). Then x(t) is an integral curve of F if it is a solution of the autonomous system of ordinary differential equations,

Such a system may be written as a single vector equation,

This equation says that the vector tangent to the curve at any point x(t) along the curve is precisely the vector F(x(t)), and so the curve x(t) is tangent at each point to the vector field F.

If a given vector field is Lipschitz continuous, then the Picard–Lindelöf theorem implies that there exists a unique flow for small time.

Examples

If the differential equation is represented as a vector field or slope field, then the corresponding integral curves are tangent to the field at each point.

Generalization to differentiable manifolds

Definition

Let M be a Banach manifold of class Cr with r ≥ 2. As usual, TM denotes the tangent bundle of M with its natural projection πM : TM → M given by

A vector field on M is a cross-section of the tangent bundle TM, i.e. an assignment to every point of the manifold M of a tangent vector to M at that point. Let X be a vector field on M of class Cr−1 and let p ∈ M. An integral curve for X passing through p at time t0 is a curve α : J → M of class Cr−1, defined on an open interval J of the real line R containing t0, such that

Relationship to ordinary differential equations

The above definition of an integral curve α for a vector field X, passing through p at time t0, is the same as saying that α is a local solution to the ordinary differential equation/initial value problem

It is local in the sense that it is defined only for times in J, and not necessarily for all t ≥ t0 (let alone t ≤ t0). Thus, the problem of proving the existence and uniqueness of integral curves is the same as that of finding solutions to ordinary differential equations/initial value problems and showing that they are unique.

Remarks on the time derivative

In the above, α′(t) denotes the derivative of α at time t, the "direction α is pointing" at time t. From a more abstract viewpoint, this is the Fréchet derivative:

In the special case that M is some open subset of Rn, this is the familiar derivative

where α1, ..., αn are the coordinates for α with respect to the usual coordinate directions.

The same thing may be phrased even more abstractly in terms of induced maps. Note that the tangent bundle TJ of J is the trivial bundle J × R and there is a canonical cross-section ι of this bundle such that ι(t) = 1 (or, more precisely, (t, 1) ∈ ι) for all t ∈ J. The curve α induces a bundle map α∗ : TJ → TM so that the following diagram commutes:

Then the time derivative α′ is the composition α′ = α∗ o ι, and α′(t) is its value at some point t ∈ J.

References 

 

Differential geometry
Ordinary differential equations